Liemar (unknown – 16 May 1101, in Bremen) was archbishop of Hamburg-Bremen from 1072 to 1101, and an important figure of the early Investiture Contest.

He was a supporter of Emperor Henry IV from 1073. In 1074 the papal legates Gerald of Ostia and Hubert of Palestrina put pressure on him to hold a local synod; he resisted, was suspended, and by 1075 his views against papal interference with bishops had hardened. In 1080, he attended the Synod of Brixen that condemned Pope Gregory VII. With Benno II of Osnabrück he commissioned the anti-papal polemic of Wido of Osnabrück around 1085. Liemar was one of many bishops who was irked by Gregory VII's encroachment of episcopal autonomy. In a letter to Bishop Hezilo of Hildesheim, Liemar complained that Gregory VII was ordering his bishops about 'as though they were his bailiffs'.

Notes

External links
 http://de.wikisource.org/wiki/ADB:Liemar
 

1101 deaths
Archbishops of Hamburg-Bremen
Year of birth unknown
11th-century Roman Catholic archbishops in the Holy Roman Empire